WVTM-TV (channel 13) is a television station in Birmingham, Alabama, United States, affiliated with NBC. Owned by Hearst Television, the station maintains studios and transmitter facilities atop Red Mountain, between Vulcan Trail and Valley View Drive in southeastern Birmingham, adjacent to the Vulcan Statue and next to the studios of Fox affiliate WBRC (channel 6).

History

Early history
The station first signed on the air on May 29, 1949, as WAFM-TV, originally carrying a limited schedule of local programming. The station began carrying select network programming on July 1, operating as a primary CBS and secondary ABC affiliate; channel 13 began carrying an expanded schedule of programming from ABC and CBS on October 1. It was originally owned by The Voice of Alabama, Inc., along with radio stations WAPI (1070 AM), and WAFM (then at 93.3, now WJOX-FM at 94.5 FM). It is the longest continuously operating television station in Alabama. During the summer of 1949, most programs aired by WAFM-TV aired during the daytime hours, allowing radio electronics and department stores to demonstrate television set receivers to potential customers. In January 1953, the Federal Communications Commission (FCC) approved an application to increase the station's transmitter power from 26,000 to 316,000 watts.

In July 1953, The Birmingham News bought the Voice of Alabama and changed the station's call letters to WABT (for "Alabama's Best Television"). The following year on July 4, 1954, WABT traded primary network affiliations with WBRC-TV (channel 6) and joined NBC; however it retained a secondary affiliation with ABC as did WBRC-TV, which took over the CBS affiliation as its then-new owners, Storer Broadcasting, had a strong relationship with the network (the company's founder and chairman, George B. Storer, was a member of the board of directors at CBS). On January 26, 1956, newspaper publishing company Newhouse Newspapers (now Advance Publications) purchased the News. The station changed its call letters again in 1958 to WAPI-TV (for Alabama Polytechnic Institute [now known as Auburn University], which owned WAPI radio from 1925 to 1932) to match its sister AM radio station; WAFM-FM adopted the WAPI-FM calls at the same time, and received FCC permission to move its frequency to 94.5 FM.

Channel 13 also became known for its heavy schedule of local programs during the 1950s and 1960s, most notably two popular shows aimed at younger audiences hosted by two early staples of Birmingham television. Magician Cliff Holman hosted a children's program on the station for 15 years from 1954 to 1968; originally debuting in March 1954 as The Tip Top Clubhouse (named after the Ward Baking Company's Tip Top Bread brand), the afternoon cartoon showcase featured Holman—who previously served as the voice and puppeteer of Mr. Bingle, a marionette character originated in 1949 by City Stores of New York, for a Loveman's-sponsored holiday series that aired on WAFM-TV in November 1950—in the persona of "Cousin Cliff" (which was given to him by Ward executives as the then-25-year-old was too young to fit the "uncle" image then common among other children's show hosts), and underwent three format and title changes between 1956 and 1958, first as Cliff's Clubhouse (after Ward Baking withdrew sponsorship due to corporate difficulties) and then as Cartoon Clubhouse and later, The Popeye Show, after WAPI acquired the local rights to the Fleischer Studios animated shorts. In 1969, Holman left WAPI after station management relegated Popeye to weekend mornings, after ratings declined following the show's move to weekday mornings and a switch to a pre-recorded format; he revived his program at WHMA-TV (channel 40, now WGWW) in Anniston later that year, as The Cousin Cliff Show. Benny Carle hosted Western Theatre, a showcase of western films interspersed with studio segments with local children as part of its studio audience that aired from 1953 to 1954, when Carle left to take over Bob Bandy's role as host the similarly formatted Circle Six Ranch on WBRC-TV, where he remained until 1964.

WBRC-TV became a full-time ABC affiliate on September 7, 1961, although it continued to occasionally carry certain CBS shows that WAPI chose not to carry until 1965. The WBRC deal with ABC—which was also a result of the strong relations between the network and WBRC's owner, Taft Television and Radio Company, which acquired that station in 1957—forced WAPI-TV to shoehorn both NBC and CBS programs onto its programming schedule. This was rather unusual, since in most two-station markets, ABC (which would not be on equal footing with CBS and NBC until the early 1970s) was typically relegated to a secondary affiliation on either one or both of the existing television stations. The Birmingham market then (as it is now) was a fairly large market geographically, stretching across nearly the entire width of the state from near the Alabama–Mississippi state line eastward to the Alabama–Georgia state line. The market also has areas of fairly rugged terrain—particularly in the eastern part of the state, which lies within the foothills of the Appalachian Mountains—which often created impairment issues with the over-the-air reception of UHF television stations. Both of these factors made prospective broadcasters skittish about launching a television station on one of the available UHF allocations. Although there were two other VHF channels in the market (channels 7 and 10), both had been allocated to Alabama Educational Television (now Alabama Public Television). This came after George Storer's company donated the two frequencies and accompanying transmitters to the Alabama Educational Television Commission (which were respectively signed on WCIQ and WBIQ on those channels in 1955) in a move that may have been an attempt to forestall future commercial competition in the market. As a result, while Birmingham had been large enough in terms of population to support three full network affiliates since the 1950s, it had a long wait for full-time service from all three networks.

The Birmingham market would not get a third commercial broadcast television outlet until WBMG-TV (channel 42, now WIAT) began in October 1965. Although WBMG nominally had a CBS affiliation, the network allowed WAPI-TV to continue airing its higher-rated programs. This was largely because WBMG had launched only one year after the FCC's All-Channel Receiver Act went into law, requiring that television sets manufactured from 1964 onward include all-channel tuning; relatively few households in the area at the time had sets with built-in UHF tuning capability, or expensive converter boxes that enabled older television sets to pick up UHF signals. Compounding things, channel 42 operated at a comparatively low effective radiated power, producing a signal that was considerably weaker than that of either WAPI-TV or WBRC-TV. To fill out its schedule, WBMG aired some NBC programs that WAPI-TV turned down or otherwise had no room to broadcast on its schedule (such as The Tonight Show). Both stations listed "CBS/NBC" as their affiliation, as WBMG maintained a nominal secondary affiliation with the latter network. On April 3, 1967, WAPI-TV became the first television station in Birmingham to broadcast all of its programming in color, having acquired camera, projection and slide equipment to broadcast local and acquired programming in the format, in addition to carrying NBC and CBS programs available in color.

In May 1970, WAPI-TV became the exclusive NBC affiliate for Birmingham, simultaneously resulting in the CBS programs not already carried by that station moving to WBMG. The switch to an exclusive NBC affiliation was because two of Newhouse Broadcasting's other stations, WSTM-TV in Syracuse and WETM-TV in Elmira, New York (which were then WSYR-TV [not to be confused with the current WSYR] and WSYE-TV respectively), were already affiliated with the network; in addition, the company's chairman was alleged to not have a great personal relationship with CBS president William S. Paley. At the same time that WAPI and WBMG aligned with the respective networks, WCFT-TV (channel 33, now Heroes & Icons affiliate WSES) in Tuscaloosa and WHMA-TV (channel 40, later WJSU-TV and now Heroes & Icons affiliate WGWW) in Anniston, two UHF stations respectively serving the western and eastern portions of Central Alabama, also became full-time affiliates of CBS; like WBMG and WAPI prior to becoming exclusive network affiliates, WCFT and WHMA—both of which signed on the air in the late 1960s—started as affiliates of both CBS and NBC. Prior to that time, the prime time schedules of the Tuscaloosa and Anniston stations virtually mirrored that of WBMG, because of WAPI's exclusive rights to network programming shown on that station for the entire viewing area.

Newhouse exited the broadcasting industry in the early 1980s to focus exclusively on its newspaper holdings. In 1979, the company sold its television stations, including WAPI-TV, to the Los Angeles-based Times Mirror Company; the WAPI radio stations were sold to Dittman Broadcasting. Following the completion of the sale, the station, due to an FCC rule in place at the time that stated that TV and radio stations in the same market, but with different ownership had to have differing call letters, changed its call letters to WVTM-TV (for "Vulcan Times Mirror"; the "V" referencing both the cast-iron statue in Vulcan Statue as well as its location atop Red Mountain at Vulcan Park, where WVTM's transmitter tower was located) on March 28, 1980.

New World Communications and NBC ownership
In March 1993, Times Mirror sold WVTM, along with its three sister stations (ABC affiliate KTVI in St. Louis, and CBS affiliates KDFW in Dallas and KTBC in Austin, Texas) to Argyle Television Holdings in a two-part deal. Under the structure, WVTM and KTVI were the first two stations to be  sold to New World, which respectively bought the stations for $45 million and $35 million; the purchase of the entire group was completed in December of that year following securement of financing for the deal.

In May 1994, New World Communications, which would sign an affiliation deal with Fox on May 22, agreed to purchase the four outlets from Argyle – in a deal structured as a purchase option – for $717 million. However two weeks earlier on May 5, New World also decided to purchase four television stations from Great American Communications, among them WBRC, for $350 million in cash and $10 million in share warrants. New World was able to finalize its purchase of WBRC on October 12, 1994, because the transfer applications for the Argyle stations were not submitted to the FCC until after those involved in the purchase of the Citicasters (to which Great American Communications was subsequently renamed) stations was already finalized.

However, WBRC and fellow ABC affiliate WGHP in High Point, North Carolina were immediately placed in an outside trust company as Citicasters restructured its plans for both stations and decided to sell them directly to Fox's owned-and-operated station group, Fox Television Stations, once it discovered New World's plan to purchase the Argyle stations (both purchases conflicted with two aspects of the FCC's media ownership regulations; the purchases of WBRC and WVTM would have violated rules that prohibited a single company from owning both the #1 and the #2 television stations in the same market, plus both group deals would have given New World three more stations than the agency allowed at the time under its 12-station national television ownership limit). In January 1995, while the group awaited the Argyle purchase to receive approval by the FCC, New World took over the operations of the Argyle stations, including WVTM, through time brokerage agreements. The transfers of WBRC and WGHP to the trust were completed on April 3, 1995, while the New World purchase of the Argyle stations closed on April 14. New World's purchase of the remaining three Argyle stations was finalized on April 18, 1995.

As a result of New World's option to sell WBRC to Fox, WVTM retained its NBC affiliation (KNSD in San Diego was the only other New World station that remained with NBC, as Fox already had a VHF affiliate in San Diego at the time, XETV (which eventually became a CW affiliate but is now a Canal 5 station targeting Tijuana, Mexico), whereas KNSD broadcast on the UHF band; the group sold its only other station not affected by the Fox affiliation deal, WSBK-TV in Boston, to the Paramount Stations Group in November 1994); KTVI, KDFW and KTBC, meanwhile, all became Fox affiliates. Fox Television Stations operated WBRC as an ABC affiliate until August 31, 1996, as its contract with that network had one year left until its expiration when Fox formally purchased the station from the trust (WBRC's conversion into a Fox owned-and-operated station on September 1, 1996, led to a six-station affiliation swap in Central Alabama in which WCFT-TV and WJSU-TV became satellite stations of ABC affiliate low-power W58CK (channel 58, now WBMA-LD); Fox affiliate WNAL-TV (channel 44, now Ion Television owned-and-operated station WPXH-TV) in Gadsden took over as eastern Alabama's CBS affiliate and Fox affiliate WTTO (channel 21) and its Tuscaloosa satellite WDBB (channel 17) became independent stations).

On May 22, 1996, New World Communications announced that it would sell WVTM and KNSD to NBC's owned-and-operated station group, NBC Television Stations, for $425 million. This deal came two months prior to then-Fox parent News Corporation's acquisition of New World on July 17, in an all-stock transaction worth $2.48 billion, in which it would acquire New World's remaining twelve Fox-affiliated stations (which would also become owned-and-operated stations of the network); The sale of WVTM and KNSD to NBC was finalized in July 1996. In November 1996, the station changed its on-air branding from "Alabama's 13" (which it adopted in 1991) to "NBC 13".

Media General ownership
On January 9, 2006, NBC Television Stations announced that it would place four of its smaller-market owned-and-operated stations—WVTM, WJAR-TV in Providence, Rhode Island, WCMH-TV in Columbus, and WNCN in Raleigh, North Carolina—up for sale. On April 6, 2006, NBC Universal and Media General announced that the latter would purchase WVTM-TV as part of a $600 million four-station deal between the two companies. Due to clauses in the FCC's regulations for television duopolies that prohibits any broadcasting company from owning two of the four highest-rated television stations within the same media market, Media General subsequently announced that it would it seek a buyer for its existing station in the Birmingham-Tuscaloosa-Anniston market, WIAT (which it had owned since the group's merger with Park Communications in 1997, and was instrumental in that station becoming more competitive with WVTM and WBRC), choosing to keep WVTM, which at the time was the higher-rated of the two stations in terms of total day viewership.

The FCC subsequently granted the company a temporary waiver of its ownership rules that allowed it to keep both WVTM and WIAT for six months after the purchase of the former was completed; Media General's purchase of all four stations was finalized on June 26, 2006. On August 2, Media General announced that it had sold WIAT and fellow CBS affiliate KIMT in Mason City, Iowa, to New Vision Television for $35 million; that sale was finalized on October 12, 2006. Under Media General, WVTM retained its existing "NBC 13" branding until 2009, when it restored "Alabama's 13" as its on-air branding.

Hearst Television ownership
On March 21, 2014, LIN Media entered into an agreement to merge with Media General in a $1.6 billion deal. Because LIN already owned CBS affiliate WIAT, due to the same FCC duopoly restrictions based on total day viewership that prompted Media General to sell WIAT to New Vision eight years earlier, the companies were required to sell either WVTM-TV or WIAT to another station owner in order to comply with the agency's ownership rules; the sales that Media General and LIN voluntarily chose to conduct in that situation were also in response to planned changes to the FCC's media ownership regulations, which would prohibit sharing agreements involving two or more television stations in the same market.

On August 20, 2014, Media General announced that it would reacquire WIAT and sell WVTM, along with WJCL in Savannah, Georgia, to Hearst Television. Media General completed its merger with LIN on December 19; Hearst closed on its purchase of WVTM and WJCL three days later on December 22. In March 2015, WVTM phased in Hearst's standardized station imaging, and dropped the "Alabama's 13" brand for the second time, in favor of branding by its call letters as "WVTM 13", similar to other Hearst-owned stations.

Programming
WVTM-TV carries the entire NBC programming schedule, although it airs the network's weekend overnight lineup on a one-hour tape delay due to paid and syndicated programming. Syndicated programming broadcast by WVTM-TV includes Matter of Fact with Soledad O'Brien (which is produced by parent company Hearst Television), Tamron Hall, The Jennifer Hudson Show and The Kelly Clarkson Show.

While channel 13 tried to carry the most popular NBC and CBS shows, a lot of fairly popular programs aired by either network were never seen in the Birmingham market because of this arrangement (even though WAPI carried selected CBS and NBC network programs in a 4½-hour block preceding its late-evening newscast, which then aired at 11:00 p.m.), and the lack of a third station to carry the remaining programs. One of the more popular CBS shows that WAPI-TV did not air was The Ed Sullivan Show, which resulted in Central Alabama viewers missing The Beatles' debut American performance on the variety series in February 1964, unless they were lucky enough to be able to get reception of CBS' affiliates in the adjacent markets of Atlanta (WAGA-TV, now a Fox owned-and-operated station), Huntsville (WHNT) or Montgomery (WCOV-TV, now a Fox affiliate). On a similar note, one of the NBC shows that channel 13 turned down was The Tonight Show, which WBMG aired instead until WAPI began clearing the program in September 1969; even then, due to the expanded prime time scheduling under the dual-network arrangement with CBS and NBC, it delayed Tonight to 11:30 p.m.

WAPI-TV strongly favored NBC for national news programming; as a byproduct of this, when CBS and NBC expanded their early-evening news programs to 30 minutes in 1963, the CBS Evening News with Walter Cronkite did not air in Birmingham for the next two years. This was due, of course, to the fact that both networks fed their newscasts to their affiliates at 5:30 p.m. Central Time (as they continue to do today). Channel 13 aired its local newscast at 6:00 p.m., and prior to the passage of the Prime Time Access Rule by the FCC in 1971, prime time network programming began at 6:30 p.m. Central Time. This left no available room on WAPI's schedule to allow it to air the CBS Evening News, even if station management had wanted to broadcast it, clearing only The Huntley–Brinkley Report in its normal time slot (Huntley–Brinkley was the only network evening newscast that was televised in Birmingham from 1963 to 1965, as WBRC-TV did not carry ABC's evening newscasts during that period).

During the 1970s, WAPI ran a distant second to WBRC in local news and general viewership, but was far ahead of WBMG, which was one of the lowest-rated commercial television stations in the U.S. at the time. It was only in western and eastern Alabama that the CBS affiliates, WCFT and WHMA, were competitive against WBRC and WAPI, particularly in local newscasts designed specifically for those areas of the state. After it exclusively aligned with NBC, channel 13 chose to fill the now-vacated 10:00 p.m. hour with off-network syndicated reruns to serve as a lead-in to its late newscast, which itself would move to 10:00 in 1977; however, the station continued to delay The Tonight Show by one hour in favor of running syndicated programming until September 1993, when it moved the program to its network-standard 10:35 slot.

News operation

WVTM-TV presently broadcasts 44½ hours of locally produced newscasts each week (with seven hours each weekday, four hours on Saturdays and 5½ hours on Sundays).

News department history
Channel 13 launched the first full-scale television news department in Alabama in 1951. For most of the last half of the 20th century, channel 13's newscasts were a solid, if usually distant, runner-up to long-dominant WBRC. This remained the case even during the second half of the 1980s, despite having the benefit of NBC's powerful prime time programming lineup of that period (which included such series as Hill Street Blues, The Cosby Show and The A-Team) as a lead-in to its 10:00 p.m. newscast.

However, after WBMA-LP replaced WBRC as the market's ABC affiliate in September 1996, WVTM had to fend off a spirited challenge from the upstart station (to which it lost two of its well-known anchors, Pam Huff and Tracy Haynes, who were later hired to anchor that station's morning newscasts). Since the start of the new millennium, it has also had to contend with a resurgent WIAT, whose news ratings prior to the February 1998 relaunch of its news department had generally languished at a very distant fourth place for much of its history up to that point. Indeed, since 2006, WIAT has consistently beaten WVTM in the late news ratings. In contrast to WIAT's renewed performance under Media General ownership, ratings averages for WVTM's newscasts slipped to fourth place among the market's five major television news operations (ahead of WVUA-CD (channel 7) and behind WBMA-LD and WIAT) during the company's ownership of channel 13, where it remains to this day.

In 2004, WVTM began utilizing a Doppler weather radar system originally branded as "Skywatch Doppler One Million" (which was later renamed "WeatherPlus Doppler One Million" and later named "Alabama's 13 Live Doppler" which is located on Bald Rock Mountain in St. Clair County; the radar provided live Doppler radar data from the Bald Rock Mountain site at a radiated power of 1 million watts, but it is no longer in use by the station. The station also utilizes data from National Weather Service radar sites nationwide. In 2017, WVTM constructed a new dual pole Doppler radar in western Tuscaloosa County in Vance, Alabama, known as "WVTM 13 Live Doppler Radar". On October 17, 2007, WVTM-TV became the first television station in the state of Alabama to begin broadcasting its local newscasts in high definition.

After Hearst Television purchased the station in 2014, WVTM-TV has shifted its programming focus more heavily towards local news. First on August 18, 2014, the station expanded its weekday morning newscast to 4:00 a.m. and expanded its 11:00 a.m. newscast to one hour, with the latter expansion replacing Daytime Alabama (a locally produced version of the syndicated morning talk show Daytime, produced by former Tampa sister station WFLA-TV) in the 11:30 slot. This was followed three weeks later on September 8 by the launch of an hour-long late afternoon newscast at 4:00 p.m. On April 27, 2015, the station expanded its 6:00 p.m. newscast to one hour, with the second half-hour replacing the cancelled sports talk show Alabama Tonight.

Notable former on-air staff
 Sophia Choi – weekend morning anchor (1991–1996; now at WSB-TV in Atlanta)
 Bill Fitzgerald – anchor/reporter (1999–2004; now at WTVR-TV in Richmond, Virginia)
 Cliff Holman ("Cousin Cliff") – children's program host (1954–1969; later at WJSU-TV; deceased)
 James Spann – meteorologist (1979–1983; now at WBMA-LD)
 Rene Syler – weekend anchor (1990–1992; later at KTVT in Dallas–Fort Worth then at CBS as host of The Early Show)
 Charlie Van Dyke – Announcer (now announcer for rival WBRC)

Technical information

Subchannels
The station's digital signal is multiplexed:

In September 2004, WVTM-TV launched a digital subchannel on virtual channel 13.2, as a charter affiliate of NBC Weather Plus; after the network formally ceased operations on November 30, 2008, it was replaced by NBC Plus, a localized default feed of the network that replaced Weather Plus on most of its affiliates. In January 2008, Media General reached an agreement with Equity Media Holdings to affiliate WVTM with the Retro Television Network; the station began carrying the network on its second digital subchannel on May 1, 2009. WVTM replaced the Retro Television Network with MeTV on 13.2 on September 26, 2011, as part of a groupwide affiliation agreement with Media General (under that deal, MeTV replaced RTV on some Media General-owned stations in other markets).

Analog-to-digital conversion
In November 2002, WVTM-TV signed on its digital television signal on UHF channel 52. The station shut down its analog signal, over VHF channel 13, on June 12, 2009, the official date in which full-power television stations in the United States transitioned from analog to digital broadcasts under federal mandate. The station's digital signal relocated from its pre-transition UHF channel 52, which was among the high band UHF channels (52–69) that were removed from broadcasting use as a result of the transition, to its former analog-era VHF channel 13 for post-transition operations. WVTM was one of more than ten television stations around the country that requested for a power increase due to problems with the reception of VHF digital signals in areas within their markets of service following the transition. The station then moved back to channel 13 for its post-transition operations. The July 2, 2020, repack moved the station to RF channel 7.

References

External links
 
 MeTVBirmingham.com – WVTM-DT2 ("Me-TV Birmingham") official website
 Birmingham TV News: Station Histories
 Birmingham Rewound-Birmingham TV Memories
 Huntsville Rewound-Huntsville AL TV Memories

VTM-TV
WVTM-TV
NBC network affiliates
MeTV affiliates
GetTV affiliates
Hearst Television
New World Communications television stations
Former General Electric subsidiaries
1949 establishments in Alabama